Landsberg may refer to:

Landsberg family
 Landsberg (surname)

Places
 Landsberg (district), Bavaria, Germany
 Landsberg, Saxony-Anhalt, Germany
 Landsberg am Lech, Bavaria, Germany
 Landsberg-Lech Air Base, Germany
 Landsberg Prison, a prison in Landsberg am Lech
 Kaufering concentration camp complex
 Landsberg an der Warthe, German name of Gorzów Wielkopolski, Poland
 Landsberg in Oberschlesien/Upper Silesia, German name of Gorzów Śląski, Poland
 Landsberg in Ostpreußen/East Prussia, German name of Górowo Iławeckie, Poland
 Landsberg Castle (disambiguation)
 Margraviate of Landsberg, a march of the Holy Roman Empire
 Palatinate-Landsberg, a state of the Holy Roman Empire

See also 
 Altlandsberg
 Deutschlandsberg
 Landsberge
 Landsberger
 Landsbergis, a surname